Sashihara (written: 指原) is a Japanese surname. Notable people with the surname include:

 (born 1992), Japanese singer, producer, and actress
Steve Sashihara (born 1957), American business consultant and author

Japanese-language surnames